is a former Japanese football player and manager.

Playing career
Uemura was born in Osaka Prefecture on December 2, 1973. After graduating from high school, he joined Yokohama Flügels in 1992. Although he played many matches in first season, he could hardly play in the match from 1993. In 1995, he moved to Japan Football League (JFL) club Vissel Kobe. Although he played many matches in 1995, he could not play at all in the match in 1996. In 1997, he moved to JFL club Sagan Tosu. He played as regular player and scored many goals in 2 seasons. In 1999, he moved to J2 League club Kawasaki Frontale. Although the club won the champions, he could hardly play in the match. In 2000, he moved to his local club Cerezo Osaka. In 2001, he moved to JEF United Ichihara. However he could hardly play in the match and retired end of 2002 season.

Coaching career
After retirement, Uemura became a coach for JEF United Ichihara (later JEF United Chiba) in 2003. In 2005, he became a manager for JEF United Chiba Ladies in L.League Division 2 and managed until 2006. In 2008, he became a manager JEF United Chiba Ladies again. In 2008, the club won the champions and was promoted to Division 1. In 2012, the club won the 2nd place Empress's Cup. He managed the club until 2013.

Club statistics

References

External links

1973 births
Living people
Association football people from Osaka Prefecture
Japanese footballers
J1 League players
J2 League players
Japan Football League (1992–1998) players
Yokohama Flügels players
Vissel Kobe players
Sagan Tosu players
Kawasaki Frontale players
Cerezo Osaka players
JEF United Chiba players
Japanese football managers
Association football forwards